All of a Sudden may refer to:
 All of a Sudden (1996 film), a 1996 Hong Kong film
 All of a Sudden (2016 film), a 2016 German film
 All of a Sudden (album), an album by John Hiatt
"All of a Sudden", by Sweeney Todd from If Wishes Were Horses (album)
"All of a Sudden", by Bette Midler from Some People's Lives
"All of a Sudden", by Yes from Open Your Eyes (Yes album)
"All of a Sudden", by Lil Durk featuring Moneybagg Yo from Too Hard